SGSS may refer to:
 Shau Kei Wan Government Secondary School, a secondary school in Shau Kei Wan, Hong Kong
 Space Network Ground Segment Sustainment, a follow-on project to the Tracking and Data Relay Satellite System (TDRSS)
 St. Gabriel's Secondary School, a secondary school in Serangoon, Singapore
 Śūraṅgama Samādhi Sūtra